De Angelis or de Angelis is a surname of Italian origin. Notable people with the surname include:
 Alberto de Angelis (1885–?), Italian writer and biographer
 Aldo DeAngelis (1931–2004), American politician
 Alex de Angelis (born 1984), Sammarinese Grand  Prix motorcycle road racer
 April De Angelis (contemporary), British dramatist and playwright
 Billy DeAngelis (born 1946), American basketball player
 Camille DeAngelis, American novelist and travel writer
 Carmela DeAngelis
 Catherine D. DeAngelis, MD, editor of the Journal of the American Medical Association
 Eleonora De Angelis (born 1967), Italian voice actress
 Elio de Angelis (1958–1986), Italian Formula One race car driver
 Enrico De Angelis (1920–2018), Italian singer
 Filippo de Angelis (1792–1877), Italian Roman Catholic cardinal
 Francesco de Angelis (sailor) (born 1960), Italian world championship sailboat racer
 Francesco De Angelis (musician) (born 1971), Italian classical violinist
 Frank D. DeAngelis
 Frankie DeAngelis (born 1986), Canadian professional ice hockey defenceman
 Gianluca De Angelis (footballer, born 1967) Italian footballer actives in 1985–2005, Serie B, C1 & C2 players
 Gualtiero De Angelis (1899–1980), Italian voice actor
 Guido & Maurizio De Angelis (contemporary), Italian composers and singers
 Jason DeAngelis
 Jerome de Angelis (1567–1623), Italian Jesuit missionary to Japan; executed by fire
 Kristen DeAngelis, American microbiologist and environmental activist
 Manlio De Angelis (1935–2017), Italian voice actor
 Maximilian de Angelis (1889–1974), German general officer during World War II; POW 1945–55
 Mike DeAngelis
 Milo de Angelis (born 1951), Italian poet
 Nazzareno De Angelis (1881–1962), Italian operatic bass singer
 Perry DeAngelis (1963–2007), co-founder and executive director of NESS, co-founder of The Skeptics' Guide to the Universe
 Roberto De Angelis (born 1959), Italian comic book artist
 Roman De Angelis (born 2001), Canadian racing driver
 Rosemary De Angelis (born 1933), American stage, film, and television actress
 Sandro DeAngelis (born 1981), Canadian gridiron football placekicker
 Tino De Angelis (1915–2009), American confidence man and commodities trader
 Valentina de Angelis (born 1989), American actress
 Victoria De Angelis (born 2000), Italian bassist
 Vittorio De Angelis (1962–2015), Italian voice actor
  (born 1981), Sammarinese motorcycle racer
 Wilma De Angelis (born 1931), Italian popular singer

See also 
 Angelis (disambiguation)
 DeAngelo (disambiguation)

Italian-language surnames